Devosia geojensis is a Gram-negative, aerobic, motile bacteria from the genus of Devosia with a single polar flagella which was isolated from diesel-contaminated soil in Geoje in the Republic of Korea.

References

External links

Type strain of Devosia geojensis at BacDive -  the Bacterial Diversity Metadatabase

Hyphomicrobiales
Bacteria described in 2008